du Arena also known as Etihad Park for sponsorship reasons, is an outdoor music venue and amphitheater in Yas Island, Abu Dhabi, United Arab Emirates. The region's largest outdoor venue, it has a seating capacity up 25,000 to 40,000 audience members at a time. It is a part of the Ferrari World Abu Dhabi complex. The venue welcomes many artists each year for annual Abu Dhabi Grand Prix post-race concerts. Festivals including Creamfields Abu Dhabi and KCON have also been hosted, and in 2023 the venue will host the first Wireless Festival in the Middle East. Madonna, Lana Del Rey, Guns N' Roses, Coldplay, Katy Perry, Usher and Blackpink are among the artists who have performed there.

Concerts

References

Music venues in the United Arab Emirates
Amphitheaters